Modereko is a jazz band, featuring drummer John Molo of Bruce Hornsby and the Range. The group has released two albums, Modereko, and Solar Igniter, a collaboration with jam/rock musician Keller Williams.

References

External links

American jazz ensembles
Jazz fusion ensembles
Jam bands
Blue Thumb Records artists